Listen! is the third studio album by Alien Faktor, released in 1996 by Decibel.

Reception
A critic for Sonic Boom gave Listen! a positive review and said "it does serve as a unique indicator in the diverse musical career that is Alien Faktor."

Track listing

Personnel
Adapted from the Listen! liner notes.

Alien Faktor
 Tom Muschitz – vocals, programming, production, engineering, mixing, mastering

Release history

References

External links 
 Listen! at Discogs (list of releases)

1996 albums
Alien Faktor albums
Decibel (record label) albums